Clugin (Romansh: Clugen) is a village in the municipality of Andeer in the district of Hinterrhein in the Swiss canton of Graubünden.  In 2009 Clugin merged with Andeer and Pignia to form the municipality of Andeer.

History
Clugin is first mentioned in 1243 as de Cloduno.

Geography

Of this area, 28.7% is used for agricultural purposes, while 62.3% is forested. Of the rest of the land, 2.4% is settled (buildings or roads) and the remainder (6.5%) is non-productive (rivers, glaciers or mountains).

The village is located in the Schams sub-district, of the Hinterrhein district.  The Haufendorf (an irregular, unplanned and quite closely packed village, built around a central square) of Clugin is located at the foot of the Schamserberg.

Demographics
 
Clugin has a population of 034, of which 2.9% are foreign nationals.  Over the last 10 years the population has decreased at a rate of -17.1%.  Most of the population speaks German (97.0%), with Romansh being second most common ( 3.0%) and Af being third (gweg%).

, the gender distribution of the population was 47.1% male and 52.9% female.  The age distribution, in Clugin is; 6 people or 18.2% of the population are between 0 and 9 years old.   people or 0.0% are 10 to 14, and  people or 0.0% are 15 to 19.  Of the adult population, 3 people or 9.1% of the population are between 20 and 29 years old.  6 people or 18.2% are 30 to 39, 2 people or 6.1% are 40 to 49, and 5 people or 15.2% are 50 to 59.  The senior population distribution is 6 people or 18.2% of the population are between 60 and 69 years old, 4 people or 12.1% are 70 to 79, there is 1 person or 3.0% who are 80 to 89.

In the 2007 federal election the most popular party was the SVP which received 81.3% of the vote.  The next three most popular parties were the CVP (8.8%), the SPS (7.5%) and the FDP (1.3%).

The entire Swiss population is generally well educated.  In Clugin about 52.6% of the population (between age 25-64) have completed either non-mandatory upper secondary education or additional higher education (either University or a Fachhochschule).

Clugin has an unemployment rate of 1.19%.  , there were 4 people employed in the primary economic sector and about 1 business involved in this sector.  2 people are employed in the secondary sector and there is 1 business in this sector.  6 people are employed in the tertiary sector, with 1 business in this sector.

The historical population is given in the following table:

Languages
The municipality is almost completely German-speaking, and German is the only official language.

References

External links

 Official Web site
 
 

Andeer
Former municipalities of Graubünden